The Kingscourt Gypsum is a geologic formation in Ireland. It preserves fossil flora dating back to the Wuchiapingian stage of the late Permian period.

Fossil content 
The formation has provided the following fossils:
Flora

 Jugasporites delasaucei
 Klausipollenites schaubergeri
 Lueckisporites virkkiae
 Nuskoisporites dulhuntyi
 Perisaccus granulatus
 Acritarcha spp.
 Guttulapollenites sp.
 Stellapollenites sp.
 Striatiti spp.
 ?Cycadopites sp.
 ?Rhizomaspora sp.
 Scytinasciae indet.

See also 
 List of fossiliferous stratigraphic units in Ireland

References

Bibliography 
 

Geologic formations of Ireland
Permian System of Europe
Permian Ireland
Wuchiapingian
Shale formations
Mudstone formations
Evaporite deposits
Permian northern paleotemperate deposits
Paleontology in Ireland